Geratal/Plaue (before 2019: Geratal) is a Verwaltungsgemeinschaft ("collective municipality") in the district Ilm-Kreis, in Thuringia, Germany. The seat of the Verwaltungsgemeinschaft is in Geraberg, itself not part of the Verwaltungsgemeinschaft.

The Verwaltungsgemeinschaft Geratal/Plaue consists of the following municipalities:
Elgersburg 
Martinroda 
Plaue

References

Verwaltungsgemeinschaften in Thuringia